1953 Országos Bajnokság I (men's water polo) was the 47th water polo championship in Hungary. There were ten teams who played two-round match for the title.

Final list 

* M: Matches W: Win D: Drawn L: Lost G+: Goals earned G-: Goals got P: Point

2. Class 
Budapest: 1. Vasas GD Hajógyár 33, 2. Fáklya Opera 33, 3. Bp. Szikra 20, 4. III. ker. Vörös Lobogó 20, 5. Bp. Haladás 18, 6. Bp. Előre 15, 7. Vasas MÁVAG 13, 8. Csepeli Vasas 13, 9. Előre MÁVAUT 8, 10. Bp. Vörös Meteor 7 point.

Sources 
Gyarmati Dezső: Aranykor (Hérodotosz Könyvkiadó és Értékesítő Bt., Budapest, 2002.)

1953 in water polo
1953 in Hungarian sport
Seasons in Hungarian water polo competitions